William O'Brien FitzGerald (4 January 1906 – 17 October 1974) was an Irish lawyer, judge and barrister who served as Chief Justice of Ireland from 1973 to 1974 and a Judge of the Supreme Court from 1966 to 1974.

He was born in Cork in 1906, and was educated in Belvedere College, Dublin, and King's Inns. He was called to the Bar in 1927 and to the Inner Bar in 1944. He was appointed directly to the Supreme Court of Ireland. In 1972, on the retirement of Cearbhall Ó Dálaigh, FitzGerald was appointed as Chief Justice of Ireland. He had a relatively brief tenure as Chief Justice and died suddenly on 17 October 1974.

References

1906 births
1974 deaths
People from County Cork
Chief justices of Ireland
Alumni of King's Inns
People educated at Belvedere College